The Society of Dilettanti (founded 1734) is a British society of noblemen and scholars that sponsors the study of ancient Greek and Roman art, and the creation of new work in the style.

History
Though the exact date is unknown, the Society is believed to have been established as a gentlemen's club in 1734  by a group of people who had been on the Grand Tour. Records of the earliest meeting of the society were written somewhat informally on loose pieces of paper. The first entry in the first minute book of the society is dated 5 April 1736.

In 1743, Horace Walpole condemned its affectations and described it as "... a club, for which the nominal qualification is having been in Italy, and the real one, being drunk: the two chiefs are Lord Middlesex and Sir Francis Dashwood, who were seldom sober the whole time they were in Italy."

The group, initially led by Francis Dashwood, contained several dukes and was later joined by Joshua Reynolds, David Garrick, Uvedale Price, and Richard Payne Knight, among others. It was closely associated with Brooks's, one of London's most exclusive gentlemen's clubs. The society quickly became wealthy, through a system in which members made contributions to various funds to support building schemes and archaeological expeditions.

The first artist associated with the group was George Knapton.

The Society of Dilettanti aimed to correct and purify the public taste of the country; from the 1740s, it began to support Italian opera. A few years before Joshua Reynolds became a member, the group worked towards the objective of forming a public academy, and from the 1750s, it was the prime mover in establishing the Royal Academy of Arts. In 1775, the club had accumulated enough money towards a scholarship fund for the purpose of supporting a student's travel to Rome and Greece, or for archaeological expeditions such as that of Richard Chandler, William Pars, and Nicholas Revett, the results of which they published in Ionian Antiquities, a major influence on neoclassicism in Britain.

Among the publications published at the expense of the society was The bronzes of Siris (London, 1836) by Danish archaeologist Peter Oluf Bronsted.

Membership
The society has 60 members, elected by secret ballot. An induction ceremony is held at Brooks's, an exclusive London gentleman's club. It makes annual donations to the British Schools in Rome and Athens, and a separate fund set up in 1984 provides financial assistance for visits to classical sites and museums.

Notable members

Thomas Anson (founder member)
Right Honourable Sir Joseph Banks
George Beaumont
Rev. Clayton Mordaunt Cracherode
Anthony Morris Storer, Esq.
Charles Crowle, Esq.
Henry Dawkins of Standlynch Hall, Wiltshire
Francis Dashwood, 11th Baron le Despencer (founder member)
Lord Dundas
Sir Henry Englefield
Stephen Payne-Gallwey, Esq.
David Garrick
Major General Claude Martin
Sir James Gray, 2nd Baronet (founder member)
Sir George Gray, 3rd Baronet (founder member)
The Honourable Charles Francis Greville
Sir William Hamilton (diplomat)
Thomas Hope
Philip Metcalfe (from 1786)
Richard Payne Knight (from 1781)
Duke of Leeds
Constantin John Lord Murlgrave
Uvedale Price
Sir Joshua Reynolds (from 1766)
Lord Seaforth
John Spencer, 1st Earl Spencer
Spencer Stanhope, Esq.
Sir John Taylor, 1st Baronet
Richard Thompson, Esq. 
Sir Anthony R. Wagner, Garter Principal King of Arms
William Wilkins
Sir Watkin Williams-Wynn, 4th Baronet
Charles Williams-Wynn (the elder)
Sir Charles Williams-Wynn (the younger)
Charles Towneley, antiquary and collector

References and sources
References

Sources
The Penguin Dictionary of British and Irish History, editor: Juliet Gardiner

This article incorporates text from:The Life of Sir Joshua Reynolds, Volume 2, James Northcote, 1819
Members of the Society of Dilettanti, 1736–1874, edited by Sir William Frazer. Chiswick Press.

Further reading
Dorment, Richard. The Dilettanti: exclusive society that celebrates art (Daily Telegraph 2 September 2008)
Harcourt-Smith, Sir Cecil and George Augustin Macmillan, The Society of Dilettanti: Its Regalia and Pictures (London: Macmillan, 1932).
Kelly, Jason M., The Society of Dilettanti: Archaeology and Identity in the British Enlightenment (New Haven and London: Yale University Press and the Paul Mellon Centre for Studies in British Art, 2009).
Redford, Bruce, Dilettanti: The Antic and the Antique in Eighteenth-century England (Los Angeles: J. Paul Getty Museum, 2008).
Robinson, Terry F., "Eighteenth-Century Connoisseurship and the Female Body" Oxford Handbooks Online. Oxford University Press. Web. 10 May 2017. 
Simon, Robin, "Reynolds and the Double-entendre: the Society of Dilettanti Portraits", The British Art Journal 3, no. 1 (2001): 69–77.
West, Shearer, "Libertinism and the Ideology of Male Friendship in the Portraits of the Society of Dilettanti", Eighteenth Century Life 16 (1992): 76–104.

External links
Review of Bruce Redford, Dilettanti: The Antic and the Antique in Eighteenth-Century England. in Bryn Mawr Classical Review 2008.08.28
 Antiquities of Ionia (Part 1 of 3)  Kenneth Franzheim II Rare Books Room, William R. Jenkins Architecture and Art Library, University of Houston Digital Library.

Cultural organisations based in London
1734 establishments in England
Organizations established in 1734
Dining clubs